Kassel (in Germany, spelled Cassel until 1926) is a city on the Fulda River in northern Hesse, Germany. It is the administrative seat of the Regierungsbezirk Kassel and the district of the same name and had 201,048 inhabitants in December 2020. The former capital of the state of Hesse-Kassel has many palaces and parks, including the Bergpark Wilhelmshöhe, which is a UNESCO World Heritage Site. Kassel is also known for the documenta exhibitions of contemporary art. Kassel has a public university with 25,000 students (2018) and a multicultural population (39% of the citizens in 2017 had a migration background).

History 

Kassel was first mentioned in 913 AD, as the place where two deeds were signed by King Conrad I. The place was called Chasella or Chassalla and was a fortification at a bridge crossing the Fulda river. There are several yet unproven assumptions of the name's origin. It could be derived from the ancient Castellum Cattorum, a castle of the Chatti, a German tribe that had lived in the area since Roman times. Another assumption is a portmanteau from Frankonian cas, meaning "valley or recess," and sali meaning "hall or service building," which can be interpreted as "(town)hall in a valley."

A deed from 1189 certifies that Cassel had city rights, but the date when they were granted is not known.

In 1567, the Landgraviate of Hesse, until then centered in Marburg, was divided among four sons, with Hesse-Kassel (or Hesse-Cassel) becoming one of its successor states. Kassel was its capital and became a centre of Calvinist Protestantism in Germany. Strong fortifications were built to protect the Protestant stronghold against Catholic enemies. Secret societies, such as Rosicrucianism flourished, with Christian Rosenkreutz's work Fama Fraternitatis first published in 1617. In 1685, Kassel became a refuge for 1,700 Huguenots who found shelter in the newly established borough of Oberneustadt. Landgrave Charles, who was responsible for this humanitarian act, also ordered the construction of the Oktogon (Hercules monument) and of the Orangerie. In the late 18th Century, Hesse-Kassel became infamous for selling mercenaries (Hessians) to the British crown to help suppress the American Revolution and to finance the construction of palaces and the Landgrave's opulent lifestyle.

In the early 19th century, the Brothers Grimm lived in Kassel. They collected and wrote most of their fairy tales there. At that time, around 1803, the Landgraviate was elevated to a Principality and its ruler to Prince-elector. Shortly after, it was annexed by Napoleon and in 1807 it became the capital of the short-lived Kingdom of Westphalia under Napoleon's brother Jérôme. The Electorate was restored in 1813.

Having sided with Austria in the Austro-Prussian War to gain supremacy in Germany, the principality was annexed by Prussia in 1866. The Prussian administration united Nassau, Frankfurt and Hesse-Kassel into the new Prussian province of Hesse-Nassau. Kassel ceased to be a princely residence but soon developed into a major industrial centre, as well as a major railway junction. Henschel & Son, the largest railway locomotive manufacturer in Germany at the end of the nineteenth century, was based in Kassel.

In 1870, after the Battle of Sedan, Napoleon III was sent as a prisoner to the Wilhelmshöhe Palace above the city. During World War I the German military headquarters were located in the Wilhelmshöhe Palace. In the late 1930s, Nazis destroyed Heinrich Hübsch's Kassel Synagogue.

During World War II, Kassel was the headquarters for Germany's Wehrkreis IX, and a local subcamp of Dachau concentration camp provided forced labour for the Henschel facilities, which included tank production plants. The most severe bombing of Kassel in World War II destroyed 90% of the downtown area, and some 10,000 people were killed and 150,000 were made homeless. Most of the casualties were civilians or wounded soldiers recuperating in local hospitals, whereas factories survived the attack generally undamaged. Karl Gerland replaced the regional Gauleiter, Karl Weinrich, soon after the raid.

The Allied ground advance into Germany reached Kassel at the beginning of April 1945. The US 80th Infantry Division captured Kassel in bitter house-to-house fighting during 1–4 April 1945, which included numerous German panzer-grenadier counterattacks, and resulted in further widespread devastation to bombed and unbombed structures alike.

Post-war, most of the ancient buildings were not restored, and large parts of the city area were completely rebuilt in the style of the 1950s. A few historic buildings, however, such as the Museum Fridericianum (see below), were restored. In 1949, the interim parliament ("Parlamentarischer Rat") eliminated Kassel in the first round as a city to become the provisional capital of the Federal Republic of Germany (Bonn won).  In 1964, the town hosted the fourth Hessentag state festival (again in 2013). In 1972, the Chancellor of West Germany Willy Brandt and the Prime Minister of the German Democratic Republic Willy Stoph met in Wilhelmshöhe Palace for negotiations between the two German states. In 1991, the central rail station moved from "Hauptbahnhof" (today only used for regional trains) to "Kassel-Wilhelmshöhe". The city had a dynamic economic and social development in the recent years, reducing the unemployment rate by half and attracting many new citizens so that the population has grown constantly.

Economy 
Several international operating companies have factories or headquarters in the city (Volkswagen, Mercedes Benz, SMA, Wintershall, Krauss-Maffei Wegmann, Rheinmetall, Bombardier). The city is home of several hospitals; the public Klinikum Kassel is one of the largest hospitals in the federal state, offering a wide range of health services.

Geography
Kassel is the largest city in the north of the federated state of Hesse in the south-western part of Germany, about 70 kilometers northwest of the geographic center of Germany.

It is located on both sides of the river Fulda. Kassel's deepest point is in the north-eastern Fulda valley at 132.9 m above sea level.

The urban area of Kassel is divided into 23 local districts, each of which has a local council with a local mayor as chairman. The local councils are elected every five years by the population of the local districts. The local advisory board can be heard on all important issues affecting the local district. However, the final decision on a measure rests with the Kassel city council.

Neighboring communities
Around Kassel is the administrative district (Landkreis) of Landkreis Kassel. The following cities and municipalities border the city of Kassel (starting clockwise in the north): Ahnatal, Vellmar, Fuldatal, Staufenberg, Niestetal, Kaufungen, Lohfelden, Fuldabrück, Baunatal, Schauenburg, Habichtswald. Of these, Vellmar and Fuldatal in the north, Kaufungen in the east, Lohfelden in the southeast and Baunatal in the south are growing ever closer to the urban area.

Culture

In 1558, the first German observatory was built in Kassel, and a later version from 1714 survives as the Bellevue Palace. The Ottoneum, the first permanent German theatre building, was built in 1604. The old building is today the Natural History Museum, and the now-called Staatstheater Kassel is located in a nearby building that was constructed in the 1950s. 
Since 1927, Kassel has been home to Bärenreiter, one of the world's most important music publishers.

Since 1955, the documenta, an international exhibition of modern and contemporary art, has been held regularly in Kassel. The documenta now takes place every five years. As a result of the documenta 6 (1977), Kassel became the first town in the world to be illuminated by laser beams at night (Laserscape, by artist Horst H. Baumann). This laser installation is nowadays still visible at weekends. Artworks from former editions of the documenta (mainly sculptures) can be found in many places in Kassel; among those are the "7000 Oaks", a work of land art by the German artist Joseph Beuys. The latest/current edition of the documenta, known as "documenta 15", runs from June 18 until September 25, 2022.

Climate 
Kassel experiences an oceanic climate (Köppen: Cfb) but not so far from marine climates, with a more notable continental influence than Berlin. Using the 1961-1990 normal and 0 °C isotherm, the city already had a humid continental climate (Dfb).

Demographics

Sights 

The bombing raids of 1943 destroyed 90% of the city center. The city was almost completely rebuilt during the 1950s and is a combination of renovated or reconstructed old buildings and architecture of the 1950s. Outside the city center, the suburbs are dominated by 19th-century architecture. The oldest monument is the Druselturm; the Brüderkirche and the Martinskirche are also, in part, of medieval origin. The towers of the Martinskirche are from the 1950s.

Churches

St. Martin, Kassel 
The main Protestant church of Kassel, it was begun in 1364 and finished in 1462. Severely damaged by British bombing in 1943, it was later reconstructed in a more modern style between 1954 and 1958.

St. Bonifatius, Kassel 
St. Bonifatius was designed and built in 1956 by Josef Bieling.

Bergpark Wilhelmshöhe
The complex includes Wilhelmshöhe Palace (with the Antiquities Collection and Old Masters), the Hercules monument, and the Lions Castle.
Wilhelmshöhe Palace above the city was built in 1786, by landgrave Wilhelm IX of Hesse-Kassel. The palace is now a museum and houses an important collection of Graeco-Roman antiques and a fine gallery of paintings comprising the second largest collection of Rembrandts in Germany.  It is surrounded by the beautiful Bergpark Wilhelmshöhe with many appealing sights.  The complex was named a UNESCO World Heritage Site in 2013.
The Hercules monument is a huge octagonal stone structure carrying a giant replica of Hercules "Farnese" (now at Museo Archeologico Nazionale in Naples, Italy).  From its base down to Wilhelmshöhe Palace runs a long set of artificial cascades which delight visitors during the summer months. Every Sunday and Wednesday afternoon at 14:30 (from May until October) the famous water features take place. They start at the Oktagon and during a one-hour walk through the park visitors can follow the water's way until they reach the lake of the Wilhelmshöhe Palace, where a fountain of about  marks the end of the spectacle.

The Löwenburg ("Lions Castle") is a replica of a medieval castle, also built during the reign of Wilhelm IX. After the Franco-Prussian War of 1870-71 Napoléon III was imprisoned in Wilhelmshöhe. In 1918, Wilhelmshöhe became the seat of the German Army High Command (OHL): it was there that the military commanders Hindenburg and Ludendorff prepared the German capitulation.

Staatspark Karlsaue (Karlsaue Park)
Another large park and also part of the European Garden Heritage Network is the Karlsaue along the Fulda River. Established in the 16th century, it is famous for the Orangerie, a palace built in 1710 as a summer residence for the landgraves. Today, the Orangerie contains the Museum of Astronomy and Technology, with a scale model of the Solar System spanning the entire park and beyond. 
In addition, the Park Schönfeld contains a small, municipal botanical garden, the Botanischer Garten Kassel.

Art museums
Europe's first public museum, the Museum Fridericianum was founded in 1779. By the end of the 19th century the museum held one of the largest collections of watches and clocks in the world.
Other art museums in Kassel include: 
 Wilhelmshöhe Palace (Antiquities Collection and Old Masters: Albrecht Dürer, Rubens, Rembrandt, Frans Hals, Anthony van Dyck)
 New Gallery (Tischbein family, Joseph Beuys)
 Hessisches Landesmuseum (with a world-famous wallpaper collection).

Other museums
 Museum of Natural History (in the Ottoneum-building)
 Museum of physics and astronomy in the Orangerie
 Marmorbad (marble bath) in the Orangerie
 Caricatura (in the Hauptbahnhof Kassel)
 Museum of Local History
 Tram-Museum Kassel
 Technical Museum and Henschel Museum
 Louis Spohr Museum (classical music composer)
 Brothers Grimm Museum in the Bellevue Palace (closed)
 Museum for Sepulchral Culture
 Museum of the Brothers Grimm (known as Grimmwelt Kassel)
 Museum of Modern Art (Neue Gallerie)
 Gemäldegallerie Kassel in the Wilhelmshöhe Palace (Schloss Wilhelmshöhe)
 Botanical Island (Insel Siebenbergen)

Sports
Hessen Kassel is the football club in the city, who plays in the Hessenliga after being relegated from the Regionalliga Südwest in the 2017/2018 season. The city's own football stadium, the Auestadion was built in 1953 and is able to hold 18,737 people. It is located in the south of Kassel at the quarter Südstadt, next to the Karlsaue.

Kassel has a long ice hockey tradition, but it was not until 1977 that the Kassel ice rink (Eissporthalle) opened on a private initiative. The Kassel Huskies were founding members of the DEL in 1994, belonging to the league from 1994 to 2006 and again from 2008 to 2010. In 1997, they were runners-up in the championship playoffs, losing to Adler Mannheim, and reached the semifinals on three more occasions. The Huskies ran into financial difficulties and dissolved in 2010. The "Young Huskies," which is a junior and youth hockey club, decided to enter a men's team in the Hessenliga. This is the fifth division and the lowest men's competition in the state of Hesse. The new club was expecting no more than 3,000 supporters for the first home game in the Hessenliga. However, they had over 5,000 supporters come to watch.

Transport 

Kassel has seven tram lines (1, 3, 4, 5, 6, 7, 8), with trams arriving usually every 15 minutes. The city also operates a light rail Stadtbahn network called RegioTram using Regio Citadis low-floor trams which run on both tram and main line railway tracks with three lines (RT1, RT4, RT5). Moreover, a number of low-floor buses complete the Kassel public transport system. The introduction of low-floor buses led to the development of the Kassel kerb which improves the accessibility at bus stops.

The city is connected to the national rail network at two stations, Kassel Central, and Kassel-Wilhelmshöhe. The traditional central station (Hauptbahnhof) has been reduced to the status of a regional station since the opening of the Hanover-Würzburg high-speed rail line in 1991 and its station (Kassel-Wilhelmshöhe) on the high-speed line at which the InterCityExpress (ICE) and InterCity services call as well as Nightjet and Flixtrain.

Kassel is connected to the motorways A 7, A 49 and A 44.

The city is served by Kassel Calden Airport.

Politics

Mayor 
The current mayor of Kassel is Christian Geselle of the Social Democratic Party (SPD), who was elected in 2017.

The most recent mayoral election was held on 5 March 2017, and the results were as follows:

! colspan=2| Candidate
! Party
! Votes
! %
|-
| bgcolor=| 
| align=left| Christian Geselle
| align=left| Social Democratic Party
| 30,403
| 56.6
|-
| bgcolor=| 
| align=left| Dominique Kalb
| align=left| Christian Democratic Union
| 9,854
| 18.3
|-
| bgcolor=| 
| align=left| Eva Koch
| align=left| Alliance 90/The Greens
| 4,957
| 9.2
|-
| bgcolor=| 
| align=left| Murat Cakir
| align=left| Kasseler Left
| 4,483
| 8.3
|-
| bgcolor=| 
| align=left| Bernd Hoppe
| align=left| Free Voters
| 2,561
| 4.8
|-
| bgcolor=| 
| align=left| Matthias Spindler
| align=left| Die PARTEI
| 1,460
| 2.7
|-
! colspan=3| Valid votes
! 53,718
! 99.0
|-
! colspan=3| Invalid votes
! 552
! 1.0
|-
! colspan=3| Total
! 54,270
! 100.0
|-
! colspan=3| Electorate/voter turnout
! 148,706
! 36.5
|-
| colspan=5| Source: City of Kassel
|}

City council

The Kassel city council (Stadtverordnetenversammlung) governs the city alongside the Mayor. The most recent city council election was held on 14 March 2021, and the results were as follows:

! colspan=2| Party
! Lead candidate
! Votes
! %
! +/-
! Seats
! +/-
|-
| bgcolor=| 
| align=left| Alliance 90/The Greens (Grüne)
| align=left| Awet Tesfaiesus
| 1,201,167
| 28.7
|  10.7
| 20
|  7
|-
| bgcolor=| 
| align=left| Social Democratic Party (SPD)
| align=left| Patrick Hartmann
| 1,028,529
| 24.6
|  4.9
| 17
|  4
|-
| bgcolor=| 
| align=left| Christian Democratic Union (CDU)
| align=left| Michael von Rüden
| 802,551
| 19.2
|  1.5
| 14
|  1
|-
| bgcolor=| 
| align=left| Kasseler Left (KL)
| align=left| Violetta Bock
| 469,800
| 11.2
|  0.6
| 8
|  1
|-
| bgcolor=| 
| align=left| Free Democratic Party (FDP)
| align=left| Matthias Nölke
| 236,057
| 5.6
|  0.0
| 4
| ±0
|-
| bgcolor=| 
| align=left| Alternative for Germany (AfD)
| align=left| Sven Dreyer
| 233,609
| 5.6
|  5.4
| 4
|  4
|-
| bgcolor=| 
| align=left| Free Voters (FW)
| align=left| Christian Klobuczynski
| 94,443
| 2.3
|  0.7
| 2
| ±0
|-
| 
| align=left| Save the Bees
| align=left| Bernd Hoppe
| 77,703
| 1.9
| New
| 1
| New
|-
| bgcolor=| 
| align=left| Die PARTEI (PARTEI)
| align=left| Jennifer Rieger
| 41,169
| 1.0
| New
| 1
| New
|-
! colspan=3| Valid votes
! 61,687
! 95.7
! 
! 
! 
|-
! colspan=3| Invalid votes
! 2,765
! 4.3
! 
! 
! 
|-
! colspan=3| Total
! 64,452
! 100.0
! 
! 71
! ±0
|-
! colspan=3| Electorate/voter turnout
! 147,462
! 43.7
!  0.9
! 
! 
|-
| colspan=8| Source: Statistics Hesse
|}

Education and research

University of Kassel 
The University of Kassel is a public higher education institution and was founded in 1971 as a so-called reform university offering new and innovative models of teaching. It is the newest university in the state of Hessen and has an urban and lively inner-city campus between the city center and the Northern city district, a typical working-class area with a multicultural population. There were 25,000 students enrolled at the university in 2018, 3381 of them non-Germans. Two hundred and twenty-four students obtained their doctorate from the university in 2017.

The University offers a wide range of study programs from organic agriculture to social work. Furthermore, it offers several English master's programs as well as two short-term international programs, the Summer University and the Winter University. The Kunsthochschule Kassel (University of Fine Arts) is also part of the university with a satellite campus directly at the Karlsaue park in the Southern city district.

Other institutions 

 Kassel School of Medicine (KSM)
 Fraunhofer-Institut für Windenergie und Energiesystemtechnik (IWES), the former Institut für Solare Energieversorgungstechnik (ISET)
 Fraunhofer-Institut für Bauphysik (IBP) Projektgruppe Kassel
 Forschungszentrum für Informationstechnik-Gestaltung (ITeG)
 International Center for Development and Decent Work (ICDD)
 Internationales Zentrum für Hochschulforschung Kassel (INCHER)
 Zentrum für Umweltbewusstes Bauen (ZUB)
 Center for Interdisciplinary Nanostructure Science and Technology (CINSaT)
 AG Friedensforschung

Associations 
 Volksbund Deutsche Kriegsgräberfürsorge German War Graves Commission
 Gesellschaft für Christlich-Jüdische Zusammenarbeit Kassel
 Spitzenverband der landwirtschaftlichen Sozialversicherung
 Deutsche Rentenversicherung Hessen
 Industrie- und Handelskammer Kassel (Chamber of Commerce Kassel)

Courts
Several courts are located in Kassel, including:

 the Federal Social Court
 Hessischer Verwaltungsgerichtshof (Administration Court of Hesse)
  (Finanzgericht)
 Sozialgericht Kassel (Social Court Kassel)
 Arbeitsgericht Kassel (Employment Court Kassel)
 Verwaltungsgericht Kassel
 Oberlandesgericht Frankfurt/Main in Kassel
 Landgericht Kassel (Regional Court Kassel)
 Amtsgericht Kassel and Staatsanwaltschaft Kassel (Local Court Kassel)

Notable people

Academia 
 Helmut Hasse (1898–1979), fundamental theorist in algebra and number theory
 Dieter Koch-Weser (1916–2015), Professor, Harvard Medical School and Harvard School of Public Health
 Franz Rosenzweig (1886–1929), Jewish-German theologian, philosopher and translator
 Georg Friedrich Sartorius (1765–1828), academia, research historian and economist

Actors and entertainment 
 Daniel Bandmann (1837–1905), actor-manager
 Hubertus Meyer-Burckhardt (born 1956), television journalist and talk show host
 F. W. Murnau (1888–1931), movie director in the silent era
 Barbara Rudnik (1958–2009), actress
 Otto Sander (1941–2013), actor
 Meryem Sahra Uzerli (born 1982), Turkish-German actress

Artists and designers 
 Arnold Bode (1900–1977), architect, painter, designer, and founder of the documenta
 Simon Louis du Ry (1726–1799), architect
 Hugo Wilhelm Arthur Nahl (1833–1899), artist who designed the Seal of California
 Albrecht Rosengarten (1809–1893), architect famous for synagogue buildings in Central Europe

Business 
 Georges Kugelmann (1809–1882), newspaper printer
 Horst Paulmann (born 1935), German-Chilean billionaire entrepreneur. He is founder and chairman of Cencosud, the largest retail chain in Chile and the third largest in Latin America
 Peter Gandert (1948-2016), Baker

Musicians 
 Franz Curti (1854–1898), opera composer
 Andreas Dippel (1866–1932), operatic tenor
 Chris Hülsbeck (born 1968), video game music composer
 Gertrud Elisabeth Mara (1749–1833), operatic soprano
 Israel Meyer Japhet (1818–1892) choral director in Frankfurt am Main
 Louis Spohr (1784–1859), composer and violinist, commemorated by a museum in the city
 Charlotte Sporleder (1836–1915), composer
 Johannes von Soest (1448–1506), medieval musician, music theorist, poet, and composer.
 Milky Chance (2013–present), band.

Politicians, military and civil servants 
Holger Börner (1931–2006), politician
Hans Eichel (born 1941), politician
Philipp Scheidemann (1865–1939), briefly Germany's Chancellor after the First World War
Josias von Heeringen (1850–1926), general
 Heinrich von Porbeck, major general, died at the Battle of Talavera (1809)
Johanna Vogt (1862–1944), suffragette and the first woman on the city council of Kassel starting in 1919

Royalty and socialites 
Jérôme Bonaparte (1784–1860), Prince, brother of Napoleon Bonaparte, lived in Kassel while he was king of Westphalia
Maria Amalia of Courland (1653–1711), noblewoman, participated in creation of park at Karlsaue
Prince Charles of Hesse-Kassel (1744–1836)
Prince Frederick of Hesse-Kassel (1747–1837)
Princess and Landgravine Augusta of Hesse-Kassel (1797–1889), consort to Prince Adolphus, Duke of Cambridge
Landgravine Charlotte of Hesse-Kassel (1627–1686), noblewoman, member of the House of Hesse-Kassel
Louise of Hesse-Kassel (1817–1898), princess of Hesse-Kassel, later queen consort of King Christian IX of Denmark
William IV, Landgrave of Hesse-Kassel (1532–1592), the first Landgrave of the Landgraviate of Hesse-Kassel
Frederick I of Sweden (1676-1751), King of Sweden and also Landgrave of Hesse-Kassel.

Scientists and physicians 
 Valerius Cordus (1515–1544) physician and botanist, authored pharmacopoeias and herbals.
 Friedrich Armand Strubberg (1806–1889), merchant, physician, colonist in North America, direct descendant of Frederick I of Sweden
 Justus Carl Hasskarl (1809–1894), botanist specialising in Pteridophytes, Bryophytes, and Spermatophytes
Carl Friedrich Claus (1827–1900), chemist
Adolf Eugen Fick (1829–1901), physiologist
Jakob Stilling (1842–1915), ophthalmologist, son of Benedict Stilling, surgeon, and brother of Heinrich Stilling, pathologist
Carl Kaiserling (1869–1942), pathologist

Sports 
Leni Junker (1905–1997), sprinter
Yunus Mallı (born 1992), Turkish footballer
Annika Mehlhorn (born 1983), butterfly and medley swimmer
Yona Melnik (born 1949), Israeli Olympic judoka

Writers and journalists 
The Brothers Grimm, Jacob (1785–1863) and Wilhelm Grimm (1786–1859), academics, linguists, cultural researchers, and authors who collected folklore and published several collections as Grimms' Fairy Tales
Helmut Kollars (born 1968), writer and illustrator
Rudolf Erich Raspe (1736–1794), University of Kassel librarian who fled to England after embezzling significant funds from Frederick II, Landgrave of Hesse-Kassel, and wrote (or compiled) The Surprising Adventures of Baron Munchhausen
Paul Reuter (1816–1899), reporter, founder of the Reuters news agency
Lucien Scheler (1902–1999), French poet, writer, and publisher
Peter-Matthias Gaede (born 1951), journalist

Others 
Herman Lamm (1890–1930), German-American bank robber
Norbert Trelle (born 1942), Roman Catholic German bishop
Nils Seethaler (born 1981), Ethnologist

Twin towns – sister cities

Kassel is twinned with:

 Florence, Italy (1952)
 Mitte (Berlin), Germany (1962)
 Mulhouse, France (1965)
 Rovaniemi, Finland (1972)
 Västerås, Sweden (1972)
 Yaroslavl, Russia (1988)
 Arnstadt, Germany (1989)
 Ramat Gan, Israel (1990)
 Kocaeli, Turkey (1999)

See also
Air-raid shelter am Weinberg

References

Notes

Bibliography

External links

 Kassel City Panoramas - Panoramic views and Virtual Tours
 Official website
 Kassel Tourist Board

 University of Kassel
 Street Crime Mapping Kassel 2009
 Video of the waterfeatures

 
1849 establishments in Germany
1840s in the Electorate of Hesse
Establishments in the Electorate of Hesse
Huguenot history in Germany